The 1924 Santa Barbara State Roadrunners football team represented Santa Barbara State during the 1924 college football season.

Santa Barbara State competed as an independent in 1924. Records may be incomplete, but eight games have been documented. The Roadrunners were led by third-year head coach Otho J. Gilliland and played home games at Peabody Stadium in Santa Barbara, California. They finished the season with a record of two wins, five losses and one tie (2–5–1). Overall, the team was outscored by its opponents 52–176 for the season.

Schedule

Notes

References

Santa Barbara State
UC Santa Barbara Gauchos football seasons
Santa Barbara State Roadrunners football